North Carolina Highway 125 (NC 125) is a primary state highway in the U.S. state of North Carolina that serves the communities of Williamston, Hamilton, Oak City, Hobgood, Scotland Neck, Halifax, and Roanoke Rapids.

Route description
The southern terminus of the route is Martin County SR 1142 (Prison Camp Road) in front of the Senator Bob Martin Eastern Agricultural Center. After leaving Williamston, NC 125 continues north to serve the small communities of Hamilton, Oak City, Scotland Neck, and Halifax. The highway has an interchange with I-95 shortly before entering its destination town of Roanoke Rapids. The route terminates at NC 48 in the downtown area.

History
The route was created in 1922, running from Williamston to Rich Square. The section between Scotland Neck and Rich Square was rerouted in 1925; the northern terminus of NC 125 was moved near Halifax. In 1965 the route was expanded northwards, replacing several secondary routes, to end at US 158 in Roanoke Rapids. The current northern terminus was achieved in 1981, following East 10th Street to the NC 48 intersection. The 1990s saw the highway receive an interchange with I-95, and the southern terminus was extended to its current position.

Junction list

References

External links

NCRoads.com: N.C. 125

125
Transportation in Martin County, North Carolina
Transportation in Halifax County, North Carolina